California's 33rd State Senate district is one of 40 California State Senate districts. It is currently represented by Democrat Lena Gonzalez of Long Beach.

District profile 
The district encompasses a strip of the Gateway Cities, stretching from parts of South Los Angeles to the coast, including the Port of Long Beach and a significant portion of Long Beach itself.

Los Angeles County – 9.4%
 Bell
 Bell Gardens
 Cudahy
 Huntington Park
 Lakewood – 36.3%
 Long Beach – 79.1%
 Los Angeles – 0.9%
 Lynwood
 Maywood
 Paramount
 Signal Hill
 South Gate
 Vernon

Election results from statewide races

List of senators 
Due to redistricting, the 33rd district has been moved around different parts of the state. The current iteration resulted from the 2011 redistricting by the California Citizens Redistricting Commission.

Election results 1992 - present

2020

2019 (special)

2016

2012

2008

2004

2000

1996

1992

See also 
 California State Senate
 California State Senate districts
 Districts in California

References

External links 
 District map from the California Citizens Redistricting Commission

33
Government of Los Angeles County, California
Government in Long Beach, California
Bell, California
Bell Gardens, California
 
Huntington Park, California
Lakewood, California
Los Angeles River
Lynwood, California
Maywood, California
Paramount, California
Signal Hill, California
South Gate, California
South Los Angeles
Vernon, California